Sucha  is a district of the city of Zielona Góra, in western Poland, located in the southeastern part of the city. It was a separate village until 2014.

Sucha has a population of 300.

There is a historic Neoclassical Saint Martin church in Sucha.

References

Neighbourhoods in Poland
Zielona Góra